The following players have represented AIK and either made at least 150 league appearances for the club, made at least 30 appearances for their national team, or received an individual award during their time with AIK Fotboll. See also List of AIK Fotboll players.

  Erik Almgren
  Andreas Andersson
  Sven Andersson
  Björn Anlert
  Lennart Backman
  Nabil Bahoui
  Mohamed Bangura
  Pierre Bengtsson
  Thomas Bergman
  Orvar Bergmark
  Kim Bergstrand
  Derek Boateng
  Celso Borges
  Björn Carlsson
  Henry Carlsson
  Lennart Carlsson
  Sven Dahlkvist
  Helgi Daníelsson
  Erik Edman
  Sebastián Eguren
  Jan Eriksson
  Dickson Etuhu
  Wilton Figueiredo
  Henok Goitom
  Göran Göransson
  Roland Grip
  Kurt Hamrin
  Magnus Hedman
  Jos Hooiveld
  Stefan Ishizaki
  Nils-Eric Johansson
  Dulee Johnson
  Göran Karlsson
  Per Karlsson
  Per Kaufeldt
  Martin Kayongo-Mutumba
  Björn Kindlund
  Rudolf Kock
  Pontus Kåmark
  Thomas Lagerlöf
  Peter Larsson
  Börje Leander
  Börje Leback
  Yngve Leback
  Anders Limpar
  Bernt Ljung
  Teddy Lučić
  Björn Lundberg
  Arne Lundqvist
  Daniel Majstorović
  Olof Mellberg
  Johan Mjällby
  Jyrki Nieminen
  Axel Nilsson
  Harry Nilsson
  John Nilsson
  Krister Nordin
  Iván Obolo
  Ebenezer Ofori
  Owe Ohlsson
  Jorge Ortiz
  Kenny Pavey
  Esa Pekonen
  Eric Persson
  Gösta Persson
  Robin Quaison
  Mats Rubarth
  Ove Rübsamen
  Pascal Simpson
  Gustav Sjöberg
  Valter Sköld
  Khari Stephenson
  Gary Sundgren
  Daniel Tjernström
  Ivan Turina
  Kari Virtanen
  Ernst Wahlberg
  Ahmed Yasin Ghani

AIK Fotboll players
AIK
Association football player non-biographical articles